Michael Alexander Carcelén Carabalí (born 13 April 1997) is an Ecuadorian footballer who plays as a midfielder for Aucas and the Ecuador national team.

Club career

Early career
Born in Ibarra, Imbabura Province, Carcelén began his career with Cuniburo FC in the Segunda Categoría de Pichincha in 2015, as a forward. In 2017, he played for Chivos FC also in the regional leagues, and also had a trial with Argentine side Rosario Central in July of that year.

Ahead of the 2018 season, Carcelén moved to Cumbayá, where he managed to featured in two Segunda Categoría editions, as a starter.

El Nacional
In 2020, Carcelén moved straight to Serie A after signing for El Nacional. He made his professional debut on 9 March, starting in a 1–1 home draw against Deportivo Cuenca.

Carcelén scored his first professional goal on 9 December 2020, netting his team's first in a 2–2 home draw against Aucas.

Barcelona SC
On 13 January 2021, Carcelén joined fellow top tier side Barcelona SC in a one-year loan deal. In December, despite not being a regular starter, he signed a permanent four-year contract with the club.

International career
On 23 October 2021, Carcelén was called up to the Ecuador national team by manager Gustavo Alfaro for a friendly against Mexico. He made his full international debut four days later, starting in the 3–2 win at the Bank of America Stadium in Charlotte, North Carolina.

Carcelén scored his first international goal on 4 December 2021, netting the opener in a 1–1 friendly draw against El Salvador.

Career statistics

Club

International

International goals
Scores and results list Ecuador's goal tally first.

References

1997 births
Living people
People from Ibarra, Ecuador
Ecuadorian footballers
Association football midfielders
Ecuadorian Serie A players
C.D. El Nacional footballers
Barcelona S.C. footballers
Ecuador international footballers
21st-century Ecuadorian people